Erich Moritz (born 10 August 1940) is an Austrian yacht racer who competed in the 1960 Summer Olympics and in the 1972 Summer Olympics.

References

1940 births
Living people
Austrian male sailors (sport)
Olympic sailors of Austria
Sailors at the 1960 Summer Olympics – 5.5 Metre
Sailors at the 1972 Summer Olympics – Tempest